Bilas may refer to:

People
Last name
 Jay Bilas (born 1963), American college basketball analyst and former professional basketball player and coach
 Rudolf Bilas (born 1992), Slovak football midfielder
 Frances Spence (born Frances V. Bilas; 1922–2012), American computer programmer
Middle name
 Har Bilas Sarda (1867–1955), Indian academic, judge and politician
 Ram Bilas Sharma (politician) (born 1948), Indian politician

Other uses
 Jabal al-Bilas, a high desert area in Syria
 Bhranti Bilas, a 1963 Bengali film
 Chandi Charitar Ukti Bilas, a heroic poetic composition traditionally attributed to Guru Gobind Singh
 Samla bilas, a species of sea slug

See also
 Vilas (disambiguation)